Paydirt is a two-player board game simulating American football.

Gameplay
Each player chooses a team that represents an actual NFL team from a specific season. For each team and each season, a Team Chart designed to reflect that team's strengths and weaknesses during that season is used to direct gameplay. Each "play" of the game consists of the players secretly choosing a type of play (run, short pass, long pass, etc.), rolling dice, and consulting the Team Charts to determine the result of the play.

History
The game was originally published by Time Warner under the name "Sports Illustrated Pro Football". Avalon Hill later bought the game and renamed it Paydirt, marketing it with a college football version of the game called Bowl Bound.  Avalon Hill hired Dr. Thomas R. Nicely, a statistician, to redevelop the mathematics of the gameplay.

Avalon Hill published Paydirt until 1995, but some enthusiasts have published Team Charts for subsequent seasons.

Sources
 http://www.datadrivenfootball.com/ - Team Charts for current NFL teams and freeware PC versions of Paydirt and BowlBound
 - Second generation paydirt charts and many free downloads dice
 Paydirt and Bowl Bound at britishempire.co.uk
 Post-1989 Team Charts
 
 http://www.nascarmodelkits.com/boardgames.html - Learn more about the history of these great football games.

Avalon Hill games
Board games introduced in 1979
Sports board games